Romanthica is a gothic rock band from Barcelona formed in 2004 by members from bands like Embellish and Ironica.

History
In 2004 the band self-released their first demo Al Final, followed by a second self-released demo in 2006 Regreso al Sur del Edén. The demo tracks were re-released in a studio album in 2014 in Eterno and a live album in 2016 MMXVII (Live). Two tracks from the demos were released in the 2017 single Recuerdos. A cover of Maná's Labios Compartidos was released as a single in 2016.

Members 
 David Gohe – vocals
 Rubén Rosas – rhythm guitar
 Sergi R. Perea – lead guitar
 Juan Carlos Herraiz – bass
 Erny Rock – drums, percussion

Discography

Studio albums 
 Eterno (2014)
 Músicas para el fin del mundo (2018)

Live albums 
 MMXVII (Live) (2016)

Demos 
 Al Final (2004)
 Regreso al Sur del Edén (2006)

Singles 
 "Mercurio" (2013)
 "Labios Compartidos" (2016, Maná cover)
 "Recuerdos" (2017)
"La Despedida" (2021)

Eps 

 Acusthica (2021)

References

External links
 
 Facebook Profile
 YouTube Channel
 Spotify Artist Page
 Instagram Official

Spanish rock music groups
Spanish pop rock music groups
Spanish gothic rock groups
Spanish hard rock musical groups
Dark rock groups
Gothic rock groups
Spanish gothic metal musical groups